2006 Júbilo Iwata season

Competitions

Domestic results

J. League 1

Emperor's Cup

J. League Cup

Player statistics

Other pages
 J. League official site

Jubilo Iwata
Júbilo Iwata seasons